Wadesboro is a town in Anson County, North Carolina, United States. The population was 5,049 at the 2020 census.  The town was originally found in 1783 as New Town but changed by the North Carolina General Assembly to Wadesboro in 1787 to honor Colonel Thomas Wade, a native son, state legislator, and Revolutionary War commander of the Anson County Regiment. It is the county seat of Anson County.

History

Originally named Newtown, the town was renamed by the North Carolina General Assembly in 1787 to honor of Colonel Thomas Wade after his service with the Anson County Regiment of militia in the American Revolutionary War.

In 1900, astronomers determined that Wadesboro would be the best location in North America for viewing a total solar eclipse. The Smithsonian Astrophysical Observatory, then based in Washington, D.C., loaded several railroad cars with scientific equipment and headed to the town.

The Boggan-Hammond House and Alexander Little Wing, United States Post Office, and Wadesboro Downtown Historic District are listed on the National Register of Historic Places.

Geography

Demographics

2020 census

As of the 2020 United States census, there were 5,008 people, 2,022 households, and 1,164 families residing in the town.

2010 census
As of the census of 2010, there were 5,813 people, 2,303 households, and 1,428 families residing in the town. The population density was 921.2 people per square mile (355.8/km2). There were 2,692 housing units at an average density of 426.6 per square mile (164.7/km2). The racial makeup of the town was 35.6% White, 60.7% African American, 0.2% Native American, 1.4% Asian, 0.9% some other race, and 1.3% from two or more races. Hispanic or Latino of any race were 1.8% of the population.

There were 2,303 households, out of which 32.0% had children under the age of 18 living with them, 31.1% were headed by married couples living together, 25.7% had a female householder with no husband present, and 38.0% were non-families. 34.5% of all households were made up of individuals, and 16.3% were someone living alone who was 65 years of age or older. The average household size was 2.40, and the average family size was 3.09.

In the town, the population was spread out, with 24.6% under the age of 18, 8.6% from 18 to 24, 23.1% from 25 to 44, 24.8% from 45 to 64, and 19.0% who were 65 years of age or older. The median age was 39.8 years. For every 100 females there were 81.9 males. For every 100 females age 18 and over, there were 76.5 males.

For the period 2007–11, the estimated median annual income for a household in the town was $32,550, and the median income for a family was $34,522. Male full-time workers had a median income of $38,385 versus $29,297 for females. The per capita income for the town was $17,055. About 19.0% of families and 22.8% of the population were below the poverty line, including 39.1% of those under age 18 and 11.1% of those age 65 or over.

Education
Wadesboro is served by the Anson County School District.

Media
 The Anson Record

Television stations available are from the Charlotte Designated Market Area, which Anson County and Wadesboro are a part of.  Additionally, the local cable provider carries one station from Columbia, South Carolina, WIS-TV.

Notable people

 Thomas Samuel Ashe, congressman from North Carolina; practiced law in Wadesboro
 Hugh Hammond Bennett, founder of the Soil Conservation Service, now Natural Resources Conservation Service, president of the Association of American Geographers
 Risden Tyler Bennett, congressman
 Tom Brewer, baseball player
 John Culpepper, congressman from North Carolina
 Edmund Strother Dargan, congressman from Alabama and representative to the Confederate States Congress during the American Civil War
 Thomas F. Davis, fifth Episcopal bishop of South Carolina; deacon at Calvary Church in Wadesboro
 Ed Emory, football player and coach
 Blind Boy Fuller, musician
 John Gaddy, baseball player
 Pryor A. Gibson, III, eight-term member of North Carolina General Assembly
 John T. Henley, member of the North Carolina House of Representatives and North Carolina Senate
 Cedrick Holt, football player
 Timmy Horne, nose tackle for the Atlanta Falcons
 Alvin Paul Kitchin, congressman from North Carolina; practiced law in Wadesboro
 Leon Levine, founder of Family Dollar variety store chain
 James A. Lockhart, congressman from North Carolina; lived in Wadesboro
 Sylvester "Junkyard Dog" Ritter, professional wrestler
 Cornelius Robinson, member of Provisional Confederate Congress
 Leonidas D. Robinson, congressman from North Carolina
 Jerome Robinson, baseball player
 Will Robinson, basketball player
 Trinton Sturdivant, football player
 Hoyt Patrick Taylor, 21st lieutenant governor of North Carolina; former mayor of Wadesboro
 Hoyt Patrick Taylor Jr., speaker of the North Carolina House of Representatives and 26th lieutenant governor of North Carolina
 William L. Terry, congressman from Arkansas
 Colonel Thomas Wade, Revolutionary War hero and legislator
 Gary Porter, former driver of the Carolina Crusher and Grave Digger Monster Truck, ran in the Monster Jam series

In popular culture
Horror film Evil Dead II was filmed in Wadesboro, and the Huntley House became the production office for the film. Most of Evil Dead II was filmed in the woods near that farmhouse, or J.R. Faison Junior High School, which is where the interior cabin set was located.

See also

 List of municipalities in North Carolina
 National Register of Historic Places listings in Anson County, North Carolina

References

Further reading

External links

1783 establishments in North Carolina
County seats in North Carolina
Populated places established in 1783
Towns in Anson County, North Carolina